The 2010 Asian Men's Club Volleyball Championship was the 11th staging of the AVC Club Championships. The tournament was held in Zhenjiang Gymnasium, Zhenjiang, China.

Pools composition
The teams are seeded based on their final ranking at the 2009 Asian Men's Club Volleyball Championship.

* Withdrew

Preliminary round

Pool A

 
|}

|}

Pool B

|}

|}

Classification 9th–10th

|}

Final round

Quarterfinals

|}

5th–8th semifinals

|}

Semifinals

|}

7th place

|}

5th place

|}

3rd place

|}

Final

|}

Final standing

Awards
MVP:  Peyman Akbari (Paykan)
Best Scorer:  Christian Pampel (Al-Arabi)
Best Spiker:  Tatsuya Fukuzawa (Panasonic)
Best Blocker:  Ibrahim Mohammed (Al-Arabi)
Best Server:  Salvador Hidalgo (Al-Arabi)
Best Setter:  Saeed Juma Al-Hitmi (Al-Arabi)
Best Libero:  Nguyen Xuan Thanh (Sports Center 1)

External links
Asian Volleyball Confederation

A
Volleyball
V